Aziz Rana is an American legal scholar and author who currently serves as Richard and Lois Cole Professor of Law at Cornell University specializing in American constitutional law.

Education
Rana received his A.B from Harvard College and his juris doctor from Yale Law School. He returned to Harvard for his Ph.D. in political science, where his dissertation was awarded the Charles Sumner Prize.

Work
Rana is best known for his 2010 book The Two Faces of American Freedom, a work based on his PhD thesis which synthesized "American legal and political history from the outset of English colonizing until the present."

He also sits on the Council on Foreign Relations, is a non-resident fellow at the Quincy Institute for Responsible Statecraft, and an editorial board member of both Dissent magazine and Just Security.

Bibliography
Aziz Rana. The Two Faces of American Freedom. Cambridge: Harvard University Press, 2010. ISBN 978-0674048973

References

External links
Aziz Rana Homepage

Yale Law School alumni
Year of birth missing (living people)
Living people
Harvard College alumni

Cornell Law School faculty
American scholars of constitutional law
American magazine editors
Legal historians